Rebecca Martin (born April 24, 1969) is an American singer and songwriter from Rumford, Maine.

Discography 
Solo
 Thoroughfare (self-released, 1998)
 Middlehope (Fresh Sound New Talent, 2001)
 People Behave Like Ballads (Maxjazz, 2004)
 The Growing Season (Sunnyside, 2008)
 When I Was Long Ago (Sunnyside, 2010)
 Twain (Sunnyside, 2013)

As producer
 Dorothy Scott, Everywhere Is Music (1997)
 The Independence Project Live at The Outlook with Frank Tedesso and Timothy Hill (1999)

Collaborations
 Once Blue with Jesse Harris (EMI, 1995) – reissued with bonus tracks by EMI/Toshiba Japan (1997)
 Tillery, Tillery (Core Port, 2016) – with Gretchen Parlato and Becca Stevens
 The Upstate Project with Guillermo Klein (Sunnyside, 2017)
 Once Blue Live at the Handlebar with Jesse Harris (Core Port, 2018) – live recorded in 1996

As sidewoman
 Paul Motian Trio 2000 + One, On Broadway Vol. 4 or The Paradox of Continuity  (Winter & Winter, 2006)

References

External links

Music
 Official website
 Rebecca Martin Voice Leaps Between Genres in The New York Times
 Jazzreview.com interview
 The Growing Season in The New York Times
 The Growing Season in Jazz Times
 The Growing Season in The New York Times
 The Growing Season in All About Jazz
 "Jazz Vocalist Rebecca Martin: Interpreter of Melodies", The Wall Street Journal
 "Spare Vocals Illuminate Emotions Underneath", The New York Times

Rebecca Martin as Community Advocate, Management
 "A Jazz Singer Fights Niagara Bottling", New Yorker
 On Victory Gardens in Kingston, New York, The Daily Freeman
 "Church in Kingston apologizes for slavery", The Daily Freeman
 "In Kingston, an African-American burial ground is rededicated", The Daily Freeman
 "Preparing for a new crop: Dig Kids program looks ahead", The Daily Freeman
 "In Land They Trust: Kingston group aims to protect open space, create rail trail in city", The Daily Freeman

Living people
1969 births
American jazz singers
Singers from Maine
Songwriters from Maine
People from Rumford, Maine
Musicians from Portland, Maine
Independent Music Awards winners
Sunnyside Records artists